The High Court of Australia is Australia's apex court. It exercises original and appellate jurisdiction on matters specified within Australia's Constitution.

The High Court was established following passage of the Judiciary Act 1903. It derives its authority from Chapter III of the Australian Constitution, which vests it responsibility for the judicial power of the Commonwealth. Important legal instruments pertaining to the High Court include the Judiciary Act 1903 and the High Court of Australia Act 1979.

Its bench is composed of seven justices, including a Chief Justice, currently Susan Kiefel. Justices of the High Court are appointed by the Governor-General on the advice of the Prime Minister and are appointed permanently until their mandatory retirement at age 70, unless they retire earlier.

Typically, the court operates by receiving applications for appeal from parties in a process called 'Special leave'. If a party's application is accepted, the court will proceed to a full hearing, usually with oral and written submissions from both parties. After conclusion of the hearing, the result is decided by the court. The 'special leave' process does not apply in situations where the court elects to exercise its original jurisdiction; however, the court typically delegates its original jurisdiction to Australia's inferior courts.

The court has resided in Canberra since 1980, following the construction of a purpose-built High Court Building, located in the Parliamentary Triangle and overlooking Lake Burley Griffin. Sittings of the court previously rotated between state capitals, particularly Melbourne and Sydney, and the court continues to regularly sit outside Canberra.

Role 
The High Court exercises both original and appellate jurisdiction.

Sir Owen Dixon said on his swearing in as Chief Justice of Australia:
"The High Court's jurisdiction is divided in its exercise between constitutional and federal cases which loom so largely in the public eye, and the great body of litigation between man and man, or even man and government, which has nothing to do with the Constitution, and which is the principal preoccupation of the court."The broad jurisdiction of the High Court means that it has an important role in Australia's legal system.

Original jurisdiction 
Its original jurisdiction is determined by section 75 and 76 of Australia's constitution. Section 75 confers original jurisdiction in all matters:
Section 76 provides that Parliament may confer original jurisdiction in relation to matters:
Constitutional matters, referred to in section 76(i), have been conferred to the High Court by section 30 of the Judiciary Act 1903. Whilst it may seem that the inclusion of constitutional matters in section 76 means that the High Court's original jurisdiction regarding constitutional matters could be removed; In practice, section 75(iii) (suing the Commonwealth) and section 75(iv) (conflicts between states) are broad enough that many constitutional matters would still be within jurisdiction. The original constitutional jurisdiction of the High Court is now well established: the Australian Law Reform Commission has described the inclusion of constitutional matters in section 76 rather than section 75 as "an odd fact of history." The 1998 Constitutional Convention recommended an amendment to the constitution to prevent the possibility of the jurisdiction being removed by Parliament. Failure to proceed on this issue suggests that it was considered highly unlikely that Parliament would ever take this step.

The word 'matter' in section 75 and section 76 has been understood to mean that the High Court is unable to give merely advisory opinions.

Appellate jurisdiction
The court is empowered by section 73 of the Constitution to hear appeals from the Supreme Courts of the States and Territories; as well as any court exercising federal jurisdiction. It may also hear appeals of decisions made in an exercise of its own original jurisdiction.

The High Court's appellate jurisdiction is limited by the Judiciary Act, which requires 'special leave' to be granted before the hearing of an appeal. Special leave may only be granted where a question of law is raised which is of public importance, involves a conflict between courts or "is in the interests of the administration of justice".

Special leave hearings are typically presided over by a panel of two or three justices of the High Court. Parties are typically limited to an oral submission of 20 minutes, in addition to any written submissions.

Appeals to the Privy Council
Appeals to the United Kingdom's Privy Council was a notable controversy when Australia's constitution was drafted. Section 74 of the constitution as it was put to voters, stated that there would be no appeals to the privy council in any matter involving the Constitution of the Commonwealth or State Government.

The section as enacted by the Imperial Parliament was different. It prohibited appeals on constitutional matters, excepting where the High Court certified it appropriate for the appeal to be determined by Privy Council. This occurred only once, and the High Court has said it would never again grant a certificate of appeal.

On non-constitutional matters, the Privy Council regularly heard appeals against High Court decisions. In some cases the Council acknowledged that the Australian common law had developed differently from English law and thus did not apply its own principles. Other times it followed English authority, and overruled decisions of the High Court.

This arrangement led to tensions between the High Court and the Privy Council. In Parker v R (1964), Owen Dixon CJ led a unanimous judgment rejecting the authority of the House of Lords decision in DPP v Smith, writing: "I shall not depart from the law on this matter as we have long since laid it down in this Court and I think that Smith's case should not be used in Australia as authority at all". The Privy Council overturned this by enforcing the UK precedent upon the High Court the following year.

Thirteen High Court judges have heard cases as part of the Privy Council. Sir Isaac Isaacs is the only judge to have sat on an appeal from the High Court, in 1936 after his retirement as Governor-General. Sir Garfield Barwick insisted on an amendment to Privy Council procedure to allow dissent; however he exercised that only once. The appeals mostly related to decisions from other Commonwealth countries, although they occasionally included appeals from a State Supreme Court.

Abolition of Privy Council appeals 
Section 74 allowed parliament to prevent appeals to the Privy Council. It did so in 1968 with the Privy Council (Limitation of Appeals) Act 1968, which closed off all appeals to the Privy Council in matters involving federal legislation. In 1975, the Privy Council (Appeals from the High Court) Act 1975 was passed, which closed all routes of appeal from the High Court; excepting for those in which a certificate of appeal would be granted by the High Court.

In 1986, with the passing of the Australia Act by both the UK Parliament and the Parliament of Australia (with the request and consent of the Australian States), appeals to the Privy Council from state Supreme Courts were closed off, leaving the High Court as the only avenue of appeal. In 2002, Chief Justice Murray Gleeson said that the "combined effect" of the legislation and the announcement in Kirmani "has been that s 74 has become a dead letter, and what remains of s 74 after the legislation limiting appeals to the Privy Council will have no further effect".

Appellate jurisdiction for Nauru
Following an agreement between Nauru and Australia signed on 6 September 1976, the High Court became Nauru's apex court. It was empowered to hear appeals from the Supreme Court of Nauru in both criminal and civil cases, but not constitutional matters. There were a total of five appeals to the High Court under this agreement in the first 40 years of its operation. In 2017, however, this jumped to 13 appeals, most relating to asylum seekers. At the time some legal commentators argued that this appellate jurisdiction sat awkwardly with the High Court's other responsibilities, and ought be renegotiated or repealed. Anomalies included the need to apply Nauruan law and customary practice, and that special leave hearings were not required.

Nauruan politicians had said publicly that the Nauru government was unhappy about these arrangements. Of particular concern was a decision of the High Court in October 2017, which quashed an increase in sentence imposed upon political protestors by the Supreme Court of Nauru. The High Court had remitted the case to the Supreme Court "differently constituted, for hearing according to law".

On Nauru's 50th anniversary of independence, Baron Waqa declared to parliament that "[s]everance of ties to Australia's highest court is a logical step towards full nationhood and an expression of confidence in Nauru's ability to determine its own destiny". Justice Minister David Adeang said that an additional reason for cutting ties was the cost of appeals to the High Court. Nauru then exercised an option under its agreement with Australia to end its appellate arrangement with 90 days notice. The option was exercised on 12 December 2017 and the High Court's jurisdiction ended on 12 March 2018. The termination did not become publicly known until after the Supreme Court had reheard the case of the protesters and had again imposed increased sentences.

History

Pre-establishment 
Following Earl Grey's 1846 proposal to federate the colonies, an 1849 report from the Privy Council suggested a national court be created. In 1856, the Governor of South Australia, Richard MacDonnell, suggested to the Government of South Australia that they consider establishing a court to hear appeals from the Supreme Courts in each colony. In 1860 the South Australian Parliament passed legislation encouraging MacDonnell to put the idea to the other colonies. However, only Victoria considered the proposal.

At a Melbourne inter-colonial conference held in 1870, the idea of an inter-colonial court was against raised. A Royal Commission was established in Victoria to investigate options for establishing such a court, and a draft bill was put forward. This draft bill, however, completely excluded appeals to the Privy Council, causing a reaction in London which prevented any serious attempt to implement the bill through the British Imperial Parliament.

Another draft bill was proposed in 1880 for the establishment of an Australasian Court of Appeal. The proposed court would consist of one judge from each of the colonial Supreme Courts, who would serve one-year terms. However, the proposed court allowed for appeals to the Privy Council, which was disliked by some of the colonies, and the bill was abandoned.

Constitutional conventions

The idea of a federal Supreme Court was raised during the Constitutional Conventions of the 1890s. A proposal for a Supreme Court of Australia was included in an 1891 draft. It was proposed to enable the court to hear appeals from the State Supreme courts, with appeals to the Privy Council only occurring on assent from the British monarch. It was proposed that the Privy Council be prevented from hearing appeals on constitutional matters.

This draft was largely the work of Sir Samuel Griffith, then the Premier of Queensland. The Attorney-General of Tasmania Andrew Inglis Clark also contributed to the constitution's judicial clauses. Clark's most significant contribution was to give the court its own constitutional authority, ensuring a separation of powers. The original formulation of Griffith, Barton and Kingston provided only that the parliament could establish a court.

The draft was later amended at various conventions. In Adelaide the court's proposed name was changed to be the 'High Court of Australia'.

Many people opposed the idea of the new court completely replacing the Privy Council. Commercial interests, particularly subsidiaries of British companies preferred to operate under the unified jurisdiction of the British courts, and petitioned the conventions to that effect. Others argued that Australian judges were of a poorer quality than those of the English, and than the inevitable divergence in law that would occur without the oversight of the Privy Council; would put the legal system at risk.

Some politicians (e.g. George Dibbs) supported a retention of Privy Council supervision; whereas others, including Alfred Deakin, supported the design of the court as it was. Inglis Clark took the view that the possibility of divergence was a good thing, for the law could adapt appropriately to Australian circumstances. Despite this debate, the draft's judicial sections remained largely unchanged.

After the draft had been approved by the electors of the colonies, it was taken to London in 1899 for the assent of the British Imperial Parliament. The issue of Privy Council appeals remained a sticking point however; with objections made by Secretary of State for the Colonies, Joseph Chamberlain, the Chief Justice of South Australia, Sir Samuel Way, and Samuel Griffith, among others. In October 1899, Griffith made representations to Chamberlain soliciting suggestions from British ministers for alterations to the draft, and offered alterations of his own. Indeed, such was the effect of these and other representations that Chamberlain called for delegates from the colonies to come to London to assist with the approval process, with a view to their approving any alterations that the British government might see fit to make; delegates were sent, including Deakin, Barton and Charles Kingston, although they were under instructions that they would never agree to changes.

After intense lobbying both in Australia and in the United Kingdom, the Imperial Parliament finally approved the draft constitution. The draft as passed included an alteration to section 74, in a compromise between the two sides. It allowed for a general right of appeal from the High Court to the Privy Council, but the Parliament of Australia could make laws restricting this avenue. In addition, appeals in inter se matters were not as of right, but had to be certified by the High Court.

Formation of the court
The High Court was not immediately established after Australia came into being. Some members of the First Parliament, including Sir John Quick, then one of the leading legal experts in Australia, opposed legislation to set up the court. Even H. B. Higgins, who was himself later appointed to the court, objected to setting it up, on the grounds that it would be impotent while Privy Council appeals remained, and that in any event there was not enough work for a federal court to make it viable.

The then Attorney-General Alfred Deakin introduced the Judiciary Bill to the House of Representatives in 1902. Prior efforts had been continually delayed by opponents in the parliament, and the success of the bill is generally attributed to Deakin's passion and persistence. Deakin proposed that the court be composed of five judges, specially selected to the court. Opponents instead proposed that the court should be made up of state Supreme Court justices, taking turns to sit on the High Court on a rotation basis, as had been mooted at the Constitutional Conventions a decade before. Deakin eventually negotiated amendments with the opposition, reducing the number of judges from five to three, and eliminating financial benefits such as pensions.

At one point, Deakin threatened to resign as Attorney-General due to the difficulties he faced. In his three and a half hour second reading speech to the House of Representatives, Deakin said:The federation is constituted by distribution of powers, and it is this court which decides the orbit and boundary of every power... It is properly termed the keystone of the federal arch... The statute stands and will stand on the statute-book just as in the hour in which it was assented to. But the nation lives, grows and expands. Its circumstances change, its needs alter, and its problems present themselves with new faces. [The High Court] enables the Constitution to grow and be adapted to the changeful necessities and circumstances of generation after generation that the High Court operates.
Deakin's friend, painter Tom Roberts, who viewed the speech from the public gallery, declared it Deakin's "magnum opus". The Judiciary Act 1903 was finally passed on 25 August 1903, and the first three justices, Chief Justice Sir Samuel Griffith and Justices Sir Edmund Barton and Richard O'Connor, were appointed on 5 October of that year. On 6 October, the court held its first sitting in the Banco Court in the Supreme Court of Victoria.

Early years
On 12 October 1906, the size of the High Court was increased to five justices, and Deakin appointed H. B. Higgins and Isaac Isaacs to the High Court. Following a court-packing attempt by the Labor Prime Minister Andrew Fisher In February 1913, the bench was increased again to a total to seven. Charles Powers and Albert Bathurst Piddington were appointed. These appointments generated an outcry, however, and Piddington resigned on 5 April 1913 after serving only one month as High Court justice.
The High Court continued its Banco location in Melbourne until 1928, until a dedicated courtroom was built in Little Bourke Street, next to the Supreme Court of Victoria. That space provided the court's Melbourne sitting place and housed the court's principal registry until 1980. The court also sat regularly in Sydney, sharing space in the Criminal Courts of Darlinghurst Courthouse, before a dedicated courtroom was constructed next door in 1923.

The court travelled to other cities across the country, where it would use facilities of the respective Supreme Courts. Deakin had envisaged that the court would sit in many different locations, so as to truly be a federal court. Shortly after the court's creation, Chief Justice Griffith established a schedule for sittings in state capitals: Hobart in February, Brisbane in June, Perth in September, and Adelaide in October. It has been said that Griffith established this schedule because those were the times of year he found the weather most pleasant in each city.

The tradition of special sittings remains to this day, although they are dependent on the court's caseload. There are annual sittings in Perth, Adelaide and Brisbane for up to a week each year, and sittings in Hobart occur once every few years. Sittings outside of these special occurrences are conducted in Canberra.

The court's operations were marked by various anomalies during World War II. The Chief Justice, Sir John Latham, served from 1940 to 1941 as Australia's first ambassador to Japan; however, his activities in that role were limited by a pact Japan had entered with the Axis powers prior to his arrival in Tokyo. Owen Dixon was also absent for several years of his appointment, while serving as Australia's minister to the United States in Washington. Sir George Rich acted as Chief Justice during Latham's absence.

Post-war period
From 1952, with the appointment of Sir Owen Dixon as Chief Justice, the court entered a period of stability. After World War II, the court's workload continued to grow, particularly from the 1960s onwards, putting pressures on the court. Sir Garfield Barwick, who was Attorney-General from 1958 to 1964, and from then until 1981 Chief Justice, proposed that more federal courts be established, as permitted under the Constitution. In 1976 the Federal Court of Australia was established, with a general federal jurisdiction, and in more recent years the Family Court and Federal Magistrates Court have been set up to reduce the court's workload in specific areas.

In 1968, appeals to the Privy Council in matters involving federal legislation were barred. In 1986, with the passage of the Australia Acts direct appeals to the Privy Council from state Supreme Courts were also closed off.

The life tenure of High Court Justices was ended in 1977. A national referendum in May 1977 approved the Constitution Alteration (Retirement of Judges) Act (Cth), which upon its commencement on 29 July 1977 amended section 72 of the Constitution so as require that all Justices appointed from then on must retire on attaining the age of 70 years.

The High Court of Australia Act 1979 (Cth), which commenced on 21 April 1980, gave the High Court power to administer its own affairs and prescribed the qualifications for, and method of appointment of, its Justices.

Legal history
Historical periods of the High Court are commonly denoted by reference to the Chief Justice of the time. It ought be noted however, that the Chief Justice is not always the most influential figure on the Court.

Griffith court: 1903–1919 
The first Court under Chief Justice Griffith laid the foundations of Australia's constitutional law. The court was conscious of its position as Australia's new court of appeal, and made efforts to establish its authority at the top of Australia's court hierarchy. In Deakin v Webb (1904) It criticised the Victorian Supreme Court for following a Privy Council decision about the Constitution of Canada instead of its own authority.

In its early years Griffith and other federalists on the bench were dominant. Their decisions were occasionally at odds with nationalist judges such as Sir Isaac Isaacs and H. B. Higgins in 1906. With the death of Justice Richard O'Connor, in 1912; the nationalists achieved majority and Griffith's influence began to decline.

The early constitutional law decisions of the Griffith court was influenced by US Constitutional law.

An important doctrine peculiar to the Griffith court was that of the Reserved State powers. Under this doctrine, the Commonwealth parliament's legislative powers were to be interpreted narrowly; so as to avoid intruding on areas of power traditionally exercised by the State Parliaments prior to federation. Anthony Mason has noted that this doctrine probably helped smooth the transition to a federal system of government and "by preserving a balance between the constituent elements of the Australian federation, probably conformed to community sentiment, which at that stage was by no means adjusted to the exercise of central power."

Griffith and Sir Edmund Barton were frequently consulted by the States' governors-general, including on the exercise of the reserve powers.

Knox, Isaacs and Gavan Duffy courts: 1919–1935

Knox Court 
Adrian Knox became Chief Justice on 18 October 1919. Justice Edmund Barton died soon after, leaving no original members. During the Knox Court, Justice Isaacs Isaacs had strong influence.

Under the Knox Court the Engineers case was decided, ending the Reserved State powers doctrine. The decision had lasting significance for the federal balance in Australia's political arrangements. Another significant decision was Roche v Kronheimer, in which the court relied upon the defence power to uphold federal legislation seeking to implement Australia's obligations under the Treaty of Versailles.

Isaacs Court 
Sir Isaac Isaacs was Chief Justice for only forty-two weeks; he left the court to be appointed Governor-General. He was ill for most of his term, and few significant cases were decided in this time.

Duffy Court 
Sir Frank Gavan Duffy was Chief Justice for four years from 1931; but he was already 78 when appointed to the position. He was not influential, and only participated in 40% of the cases during his tenure. For the most part he gave short judgements, or joined in the judgements of his colleagues. His frequent absence resulted in many tied decisions which have no lasting value as precedent.

Important cases of this time include:

Attorney-General (New South Wales) v Trethowan
The First State Garnishee case
Tuckiar v The King

Latham court: 1935–1952 

John Latham was elevated to Chief Justice in 1935. His tenure is most notable for the court's interpretation of wartime legislation, and the subsequent transition back to peace.

Most legislation was upheld as enabled by the defence power. The Curtin Labor government's legislation was rarely successfully challenged, with the court recognizing a necessity that the defence power permit the federal government to govern strongly.

The court allowed for the establishment of a national income tax scheme in the First Uniform Tax case, and upheld legislation declaring the pacifist Jehovah's Witnesses denomination to be a subversive organisation.

Following the war, the court reigned in the scope of the defence power. It struck down several key planks of the Chifley Labor government's reconstruction program, notably an attempt to nationalise the banks in the Bank Nationalisation case (1948), and an attempt to establish a comprehensive medical benefits scheme in the First Pharmaceutical Benefits case (1945).

Other notable cases of the era include:

The Communist Party case
Proudman v Dayman
R v Burgess; Ex parte Henry

Dixon court: 1952–1964 

Owen Dixon was appointed Chief Justice in 1952, after 23 years as a Justice on the court.

During his tenure the court experienced what some have described as a 'Golden Age'. Dixon had strong influence on the court during this period. The court experienced a marked increase in the number of joint judgements, many of which were led by Dixon. The era has also been noted for the presence of generally good relations between the court's judges.

Notable decisions of the Dixon court include:

The Boilermakers' case
Second Uniform Tax case

During Dixon's time, the court came to adopt in majority several of the views he had expressed in minority years prior.

Barwick court: 1964–1981 

Garfield Barwick was appointed Chief Justice in 1964.

Among other things, the Barwick court is known for controversially deciding several cases on tax avoidance and tax evasion, almost always deciding against the taxation office. Led by Barwick himself in most judgments, the court distinguished between avoidance (legitimately minimising one's tax obligations) and evasion (illegally evading obligations). The decisions effectively nullified the anti-avoidance legislation and led to the proliferation of avoidance schemes in the 1970s, a result which drew much criticism upon the court.

Notable decisions of the Barwick Court include:

Bradley v Commonwealth
The Concrete Pipes case
The Seas and Submerged Lands case
The First and Second Territory Senators' cases
Russell v Russell
Cormack v Cope
Victoria v Commonwealth

Gibbs court: 1981–1987 

Sir Harry Gibbs was appointed as Chief Justice in 1981.

Among the Gibbs court's notable jurisprudence is an interpretive expansion of the Commonwealth's legislative powers. Scholars have also noted a tendency away from the traditions of legalism and conservatism that characterised the Dixon and Barwick courts.

Notable decisions of the court include:

Koowarta v Bjelke-Petersen
The Tasmanian Dams case
Kioa v West
The Chamberlain case
A v Hayden

Mason court: 1987–1995 
Sir Anthony Mason became Chief Justice in 1987.

The Mason court is known for being one of the most legally liberal benches of the court. It was a notably stable court, with the only change in its bench being the appointment of McHugh following Wilson's retirement.

Some of the decisions of the court in this time were politically controversial. Scholars have noted that the Mason court has tended to receive 'high praise and stringent criticism in equal measure'.

Notable decisions of the court include:

Cole v Whitfield
Dietrich v R
Mabo v Queensland (No 2)
Polyukhovich v Commonwealth
Sykes v Cleary
Waltons Stores v Maher 
This era is also notable for originating Australia's implied freedom of political communication jurisprudence; through the cases ACT v Cth and Theophanous.

Brennan court: 1995–1998 
Gerard Brennan succeeded Mason in 1995.

The court experienced many changes in members and significant cases in this three year period.

Notable decisions of the court include:

Ha v New South Wales
Grollo v Palmer
Kable v DPP
Lange v ABC
The Wik case

Gleeson court: 1998–2008 
Murray Gleeson was appointed Chief Justice in 1998. The Gleeson Court has been regarded as a relatively conservative period of the court's history.

Notable decisions of the court include:

Al-Kateb v Godwin
Egan v Willis
New South Wales v Commonwealth (aka. 'Workchoices')
R v Tang
Re Wakim; Ex parte McNally
Sue v Hill 
Western Australia v Ward 
The Yorta Yorta case

French court: 2008–2017 
Robert French was appointed Chief Justice in September 2008.

Notable decisions of the French court include:

Pape v Commissioner of Taxation 
Plaintiff M70 
Williams v Commonwealth

Kiefel court: January 2017 – Present 
Susan Kiefel was appointed Chief Justice in January 2017.

Legal scholars have noted a shift in judicial style within the Kiefel court to one that attempts broad consensus. The frequency of dissenting judgements has decreased; and there have been relatively fewer decisions of a 4–3 split. Extrajudicially, Kiefel has expressed sympathy for judicial practices that maximise consensus and minimise dissent.

Additionally, it has been noted that Kiefel, Keane, and Bell frequently deliver a joint judgement when a unanimous consensus is not reached; often resulting in their decisions being determinative of the majority. This recent practice of the court has been criticized by the scholar Jeremy Gans, with comparisons drawn to the 'Four Horsemen' era of the US Supreme Court.

Notable decisions of the Kiefel court include:

Re Canavan
Wilkie v Commonwealth
AB v CD; EF v CD
Pell v The Queen
Love v Commonwealth
Palmer v Western Australia

Appointment process, composition, and working conditions

Appointment process
High Court Justices are appointed by the Governor-General in Council. The advice of the Council typically consists of the advice of the Prime Minister, assisted by the Attorney-General for Australia.  Advice from the Attorney-General is legally required by implication, because since 1979 the Attorney-General of the Commonwealth has been required by statute to consult the Attorneys-General of the States (but not the Territories). Some reformers have advocated for States to have a determinative role.

Originally, no particular qualifications for appointment to the High Court were required by the Constitution or by statute.  The only constitutional requirement is still, since 1977, that the appointee be under the compulsory retirement age of 70. Further qualifications were introduced by statute in 1979: that an appointee be a judge of a federal, state or territory court; or have been an Australian legal practitioner for at least five years. Unlike members of the Parliament, it is not necessary to be an Australian Citizen and a member of the Court may be a dual citizen.

The appointment process has been relatively uncontroversial.  This has, however, been due in part to the opacity of the process.  There is no procedure for application, the only definite criteria are the minimal criteria above, and nothing is publicly known until an appointee is announced. Appointment to federal courts was extensively formalised in 2007, except for the High Court, and those reforms were reversed by the next federal government. Some recent Attorneys-General have stated that they were consulting widelyto include, for instance, Australian Women Lawyers, the National Association of Commonwealth Legal Centres and the heads of Australian law schools.  However, the nature of the Attorney-General's consultations remains almost wholly discretionary.

Some appointments to the High Court have displayed clear political influence. Three early Justices had been conservative politicians prior to their appointment as Chief Justice; and Justices Evatt, McTiernan, and Murphy were all Labor party politicians at some stage in their careers prior to being appointed to the High Court by a Labor prime minister.

Composition 
The High Court has seven Justicesthe Chief Justice and six others.

 the High Court has had 44 Justices, twelve of whom have been Chief Justice.

Initial composition 

The first High Court bench consisted of three justices; Samuel Griffith, Edmund Barton, and Richard O'Connor.

According to the contemporary press, among those considered and overlooked were Henry Higgins, Isaac Isaacs, Andrew Clark, John Downer, Josiah Symon, and George Wise.

Barton and O'Connor were both members of the federal parliament's government bench. Each appointee had participated in the drafting of Australia's constitution. All three have been described as relatively conservative justices for the time; and were strongly influenced in by United States law in their constitutional jurisprudence.

Expansion of the court 
In 1906 at the request of the Justices, two seats were added to the bench; with Isaacs and Higgins being appointed.

After O'Connor's death in 1912, an amendment was made to the Judiciary Act expanding the bench to seven. However, these seats were left vacant for most of 1930.

Following Isaacs retirement in 1931, his seat was left empty and an amendment to the Judiciary Act reduced the number of seats to six. This however led to some decisions being split three-all.

With the appointment of Justice Webb in 1946, the court returned to seven seats; and since then the court has had a full bench of seven Justices.

Historical demographics
The vast majority of the High Court's fifty-six appointees have been men. Seven women have been appointed in the court's history.
 The first female appointee to the bench was Mary Gaudron, second Susan Crennan. Three Justices on the current bench are female; Justices Kiefel, Gordon, and Gleeson. As of October 2022, there is a female majority for the first time, since the retirement of Patrick Keane and his replacement by Jayne Jagot.

In 2017, Justice Kiefel became the first woman to be appointed Chief Justice.

Michael Kirby was the first openly gay justice of the Court. He was replaced by Virginia Bell, who is the first person on the bench to identify as a lesbian.

Twenty-eight appointees have been residents of New South Wales, twenty-five of which graduated from Sydney Law School. Sixteen have come from Victoria, eight from Queensland, and four from Western Australia. No resident of South Australia, Tasmania, or any of the Territories has ever been appointed to the bench.

The majority of Justices have been of Protestant backgrounds, with a smaller number of a Catholic background. Two Jewish members have been appointed, Sir Isaac Isaacs and James Edelman, making them the only members of the court to have a faith background other than Christianity. However, many justices have refrained from commenting publicly upon their religious views.

Almost all judges on the High Court have "taken silk" in some form prior to their appointment, in the form of appointment to King's Counsel (KC), Queen's Counsel (QC) or Senior Counsel (SC). The exceptions are Starke, McTiernan, Webb, Walsh, Kirby, French, Edelman and Jagot.

While thirteen historical justices of the court have previously served in a Parliament; no parliamentarian has been appointed to the Court since Lionel Murphy in 1975.

Working conditions 
Salaries are determined by the Remuneration Tribunal. The regular justices receive $551,880, while the Chief justice receives $608,150. High Court judicial compensation is constitutionally protected from decrease during appointment.

The court typically sits for two weeks for each calendar month of the year, excepting for January and July in which no sitting days are held.

Judicial associates
Each judge engages associates for assistance in exercising their functions. The usual practice is to engage two associates simultaneously for a one-year term. Additionally, the Chief Justice is assisted by a legal research officer employed by the court library.

Associates have varying responsibilities; typically their work involves legal research, assistance in preparation for oral arguments, tipping in court during oral argument, editing judgments and assisting with extrajudicial functions, such as speechwriting. Associates are typically recruited after having graduated from an Australian law school with grades at or near the top of their class. Hundreds of applications for associate positions are received by the High Court annually.

Many High Court associates have gone on to illustrious careers. Examples of former associates include Adrienne Stone and Nicola Roxon.

Three High Court justices served as associates prior to their elevation to the bench: Aickin to Dixon, Gageler to Mason, and Edelman to Toohey.

Facilities

Building

The High Court of Australia building is located on the shore of Lake Burley Griffin in Canberra's Parliamentary Triangle. The High Court was designed between 1972 and 1974 by the Australian architect Christopher Kringas (1936–1975), a director of the firm Edwards Madigan Torzillo and Briggs. The building was constructed from 1975 to 1980. Its international architectural significance is recognised by the Union of International Architects register of 'Architectural Heritage of the 20th Century'. It received the Australian Institute of Architects 'Canberra Medallion' in 1980 and the award for 'Enduring Architecture' in 2007. The High Court was added to the Commonwealth Heritage List in 2004.

Online
The High Court makes itself generally available to the public through its own website. Judgment Alerts, available on the Court's website and by email with free subscription, provide subscribers with notice of upcoming judgments (normally a week beforehand) and, almost immediately after the delivery of a major judgment, with a brief summary of it (normally not more than one page). All of the Court's judgments, as well as transcripts of its hearings since 2009 and other materials, are made available, free of charge, through the Australasian Legal Information Institute. The Court has recently established on its website an "eresources" page, containing for each case its name, keywords, mentions of relevant legislation and a link to the full judgment; these links go to the original text from 2000 onward, scanned texts from 1948 to 1999 and facsimiles from the Commonwealth Law Reports for their first 100 volumes (1903 to 1959); there are also facsimiles of some unreported judgments (1906–2002). Since October 2013, audio-visual recordings of full-court hearings held in Canberra have been available on its website.

Gallery

See also

Australian court hierarchy
Judiciary Act 1903
Judiciary of Australia
Law of Australia
List of chief justices of Australia by time in office
List of High Court of Australia cases
List of justices of the High Court of Australia
List of law schools attended by Australian High Court justices

Notes

References

Attribution

Further reading

External links

High Court of Australia official website
High Court Documentary, a short documentary on the High Court and its building.
The Highest Court Documentary film, 1998, DVD. Only film ever permitted to be made of the High Court in session, before video recordings of its proceedings.
Judiciary Act 1903 (Cth) in ComLaw
High Court of Australia Act 1979 (Cth) in ComLaw

 
1903 establishments in Australia
1975 Australian constitutional crisis
Australian appellate courts
Australian constitutional law
Australian National Heritage List
Brutalist architecture in Australia
Buildings and structures completed in 1980
Commonwealth Heritage List places in the Australian Capital Territory
Courthouses in Canberra
Law of Nauru
Courts and tribunals established in 1903